Georges Berr (30 July 1867 – 21 July 1942) in Paris, was a French actor and dramatist, a member and sociétaire of the Comédie-Française from 1886 to 1923.

Under the pseudonyms Colias and Henry Bott he wrote several plays, particularly in collaboration with Louis Verneuil. He was Jean-Pierre Aumont's uncle.

Plays 
Partial list of plays written or cowritten by Berr.
 L'Amant de Madame Vidal 
 La Pomme by Verneuil and Berr
 
 1900: Moins cinq... by Paul Gavault and Berr, Théâtre du Palais-Royal
 1901: L'Inconnue by Gavault and Berr, Théâtre du Palais-Royal
 1901: Madame Flirt by Gavault and Berr, Théâtre de l'Athénée
 1902: Les Aventures du capitaine Corcoran by Gavault, Berr and Adrien Vély, Théâtre du Châtelet 
 1902: La Carotte by Berr, Paul Dehere and Marcel Guillemaud, Théâtre du Palais-Royal
 1904: La Dette by Gavault and Berr, Théâtre de l'Odéon 
 1905: Les Merlereau, 3 acts comedy, Théâtre des Bouffes Parisiens 
 1905: La Marche forcée by Berr and Marc Sonal, Théâtre du Palais-Royal 
 1913: Un jeune homme qui se tue, 4 acts comedy, Théâtre Femina 
 1914: J'ose pas, 3 acts comedy, Théâtre du Palais-Royal
 1922: Dom Juan de Molière, Comédie-Française
 1925: Azaïs by Louis Verneuil and Berr 
 1928: Le passage de Vénus, 3 acts comedie-bouffe, Théâtre Sarah-Bernhardt
 1930: Miss France by Berr and Verneui, Théâtre Édouard VII
 1930: Guignol, un cambrioleur by Berr and Verneuil, Théâtre de la Potinière
 1934: Mon crime de Georges Berr and Verneuil, Théâtre des Variétés  
 1935: Les Fontaines lumineuses by Berr and Verneuil, Théâtre des Variétés
 1937: The Train for Venice by Louis Verneuil and Berr, Théâtre Saint-Georges
 1946: Azaïs, 3 acts comedy by Verneuil and Berr, Théâtre Daunou

Filmography

Actor 
 1910: Le Barbier de Séville: Figaro

Director 
 1909: L'Enfant prodigue, script by Henri Lavedan, with Eugène Silvain
 1909: Les Précieuses ridicules, after Molière, with Béatrix Dussane

Writer 
 The Million (Silent film, 1914, based on Le Million) 
 The Frisky Mrs. Johnson (Silent film, 1920, based on Madame Flirt) 
 La principessa Bebè (Silent film, 1921, based on Princesse Bébé) 
 The World at Her Feet (Silent film, 1927, based on Maître Bolbec and son mari) 
 My Sister and I (Silent film, 1929, based on Ma sœur et moi) 
 Burglars (German, 1930, based on Guignol, le cambrioleur) 
  (French, 1931, based on Guignol, le cambrioleur) 
 Le Million (French, 1931, based on Le Million) 
 My Cousin from Warsaw (French, 1931, based on Ma cousine de Varsovie) 
 My Cousin from Warsaw (German, 1931, based on Ma cousine de Varsovie) 
  (French, 1932, based on Un coup de téléphone) 
  (French, 1932, based on Azaïs) 
 Just My Luck (1933, based on Azaïs) 
 Ihre Durchlaucht, die Verkäuferin (German, 1933, based on Ma sœur et moi) 
  (French, 1934, based on Ma sœur et moi) 
  (French, 1934, original screenplay) 
 The Bread Peddler (French, 1934, dialogue) 
 Arlette et ses papas (French, 1934, based on Avril) 
  (French, 1934, based on L'École des contribuables) 
  (French, 1934, based on Maître Bolbec et son mari) 
 Le Bossu (French, 1934, dialogue) 
  (French, 1935, dialogue) 
 Speak to Me of Love (French, 1935, based on Parlez-moi d'amour) 
  (French, 1935, dialogue) 
 The Lover of Madame Vidal (French, 1936, based on L'amant de Madame Vidal) 
  (French, 1937, dialogue) 
 True Confession (1937, based on Mon Crime) 
 The Train for Venice (French, 1938, based on Le train pour Venise) 
 My Life with Caroline (1941, based on Le train pour Venise) 
 Mischievous Susana (Spanish, 1945, based on Ma sœur et moi) 
 Cross My Heart (1946, based on Mon Crime) 
 Ma tante d'Honfleur (French, 1949, based on Ma tante d'Honfleur) 
 Canas al aire (Spanish, 1949, based on L'amant de Madame Vidal) 
 My Sister and I (Swedish, 1950, based on Ma sœur et moi) 
 Cosas de mujer (Spanish, 1951, based on Maître Bolbec and son mari) 
  (French, 1951, based on Le Passage de Vénus) 
 My Sister and I (German, 1954, based on Ma sœur et moi)

Career at the Comédie-Française 
 Admitted at the Comédie-Française in 1886
 Sociétaire from 1893 to 1923
 326th sociétaire
 Honorary sociétaire in 1923
 1891: Thermidor by Victorien Sardou
 1897: Mieux vaut douceur et violence by Édouard Pailleron
 1899: Le Torrent by Maurice Donnay
 1899: La Conscience de l'enfant by Gaston Devore
 1902: La Grammaire by Eugène Labiche and Alphonse Jolly
 1902: La Petite Amie by Eugène Brieux
 1903: Business is business by Octave Mirbeau
 1904: Le Paon by Francis de Croisset
 1905: Don Quichotte by Jean Richepin after Miguel de Cervantes
 1905: Il était une bergère by André Rivoire 
 1906: Les Plaideurs by Racine
 1907: Marion de Lorme by Victor Hugo
 1907: L'Amour veille by Robert de Flers and Gaston Arman de Caillavet
 1908: Le Bon Roi Dagobert by André Rivoire 
 1912: Le Mariage forcé by Molière
 1913: La Marche nuptiale by Henry Bataille 
 1915: Le Mariage forcé by Molière
 1920: L'Amour médecin by Molière
 1920: The Imaginary Cuckold by Molière
 1921: Le Sicilien ou l'Amour peintre by Molière
 1921: Les Fâcheux by Molière
 1922: Dom Juan by Molière
 1922: Remerciement au roi by Molière]
 1922: L'Amour veille by Gaston Arman de Caillavet and Robert de Flers 
 1923: Le Dépit amoureux by Molière
 1924: Les Trois Sultanes by Charles-Simon Favart

External links 
 
 Georges Berr on Data.bnf.fr
 Georges Berr on Artlyriquefr.fr

French male actors
19th-century French dramatists and playwrights
20th-century French dramatists and playwrights
French male screenwriters
20th-century French screenwriters
Sociétaires of the Comédie-Française
Writers from Paris
1867 births
1942 deaths
20th-century French male writers